The term geometria may refer to:

 Geometry, a branch of mathematics
 Geometria (film), a 1987 short film by Guillermo del Toro
 376 Geometria, a main belt asteroid